Vladimír Vůjtek Sr. (born 17 May 1947) is a Czech former ice hockey coach and former player. As a coach he won Russian Superleague twice with Lokomotiv Yaroslavl in 2002 and 2003.

2012 – Won silver medal on Ice Hockey World Championships with Slovakia

Vladimír Vůjtek Sr. is the father of Vladimír Vůjtek Jr.

External links

 New face at the helm - Vladimir Vujtek named head coach of Slovak national team

1947 births
Czech ice hockey coaches
Czechoslovak ice hockey centres
Czechoslovak ice hockey players
HK Dukla Trenčín players
HC Vítkovice players
Living people
People from Klimkovice
Slovakia men's national ice hockey team coaches
Sportspeople from the Moravian-Silesian Region
Czech expatriate ice hockey people
Czech expatriate sportspeople in Russia
Czech expatriate sportspeople in Slovakia
Czech ice hockey centres
Czechoslovak ice hockey coaches
Czech Republic men's national ice hockey team coaches